Giles County is a county located in the U.S. state of Virginia on the West Virginia state line. As of the 2020 census, the population was 16,787. Its county seat is Pearisburg.

Giles County is included in the Blacksburg-Christiansburg, VA Metropolitan Statistical Area.

Giles County is the location of Mountain Lake, one of only two natural fresh water lakes in Virginia. The lake drains into Little Stony Creek, which passes over a waterfall known as The Cascades before reaching the New River.

History

Giles County was established in 1806 from Montgomery, Monroe, Wythe, and Tazewell counties. The county is named for William Branch Giles who was born in Amelia County in 1762. Giles became a lawyer and from there was elected to the United States House of Representatives where he served from 1790 to 1815. He also served in the Virginia General Assembly from 1816 to 1822. In 1827, he was elected Governor. In all, he served his nation and state around a total of forty years.

Geography

Adjacent counties
 Summers County, West Virginia – north
 Monroe County, West Virginia – north
 Craig County – east
 Montgomery County – southeast
 Pulaski County – south
 Bland County – west
 Mercer County, West Virginia – northwest

National protected area
 Jefferson National Forest (part)

Major highways
  (future)
 
 
  (disconnected; one piece comes in from Bland County to VA 100 while the other goes from U.S. 460 into Craig County)

Railroads
 Norfolk Southern (Virginia Division)

Demographics

2020 census

Note: the US Census treats Hispanic/Latino as an ethnic category. This table excludes Latinos from the racial categories and assigns them to a separate category. Hispanics/Latinos can be of any race.

2010 Census
As of the census of 2010, there were 17,286 people, 7,215 households, and 4,899 families residing in the county.  The population density was 48 people per square mile (18/km2).  There were 8,319 housing units at an average density of 23 per square mile (9/km2).  The racial makeup of the county was 96.74% White, 1.51% Black or African American, 0.12% Native American, 0.32% Asian, 0.36% from other races, and 0.95% from two or more races.  1.21% of the population were Hispanic or Latino of any race.

There were 7,215 households, out of which 29.27% had children under the age of 18 living with them, 52.46% were married couples living together, 10.49% had a female householder with no husband present, and 32.10% were non-families. 27.86% of all households were made up of individuals, and 12.56% had someone living alone who was 65 years of age or older.  The average household size was 2.38 and the average family size was 2.88.

In the county, the population was spread out, with 22.70% under the age of 18, 4.89% from 20 to 24, 23.85% from 25 to 44, 29.43% from 45 to 64, and 18.03% who were 65 years of age or older.  The median age was 43 years. For every 100 females, there were 96.14 males.  For every 100 females age 18 and over, there were 93.55 males.

The median income for a household in the county was $45,231, and the median income for a family was $53,750. Males had a median income of $41,521 versus $36,886 for females. The per capita income for the county was $23,766.  About 6.60% of families (2000 census) and 12.7% of the population were below the poverty line(2012), including 17.70% of those under age 18 (2012)and 10.50% of those age 65 or over (2000 census).

Government

Board of Supervisors
 At-Large District: Paul W. "Chappy" Baker (I)
 At-Large District: Richard "Ricky" McCoy (I)
 Central District: Jeffrey Morris (I)
 Eastern District: Perry Martin (I)
 Western District: John Lawson (I)

Constitutional officers
 Clerk of the Circuit Court: Sherry E Gautier (I)
 Commissioner of the Revenue: Lisa Corell (I)
 Commonwealth's Attorney: Robert M. Lilly, Jr. (I)
 Sheriff: W. Morgan Millirons (I)
 Treasurer: Angela L. Higginbotham (I)

Giles is represented by Democrat John S. Edwards in the Virginia Senate, Republican Jason Ballard in the Virginia House of Delegates, and Republican H. Morgan Griffith in the U.S. House of Representatives.

Law enforcement 

The Giles County Sheriff's Department patrols and investigates crimes in the county. It also serves process, provides security for the county court, and operates the county's E-911 service. Since the establishment of the Sheriff's Office, 1 officer has died in the line of duty, in 1954.

Presidential election results

Communities

Towns
Giles County has five incorporated towns.  Only nine other counties have more towns than Giles.  Of the 191 towns in Virginia, Glen Lyn is the fifth smallest in population.  Thirty-nine percent of Giles residents live in one of the five towns.

Unincorporated communities

Education 
Giles county is home to three public elementary/middle schools, two public high schools, and one technical school:
 Eastern Elementary/Middle School (Pembroke)
 Macy McClaugherty Elementary/Middle School (Pearisburg)
 Narrows Elementary/Middle School (Narrows)
 Giles High School  (Pearisburg)
 Narrows High School (Narrows)
 Giles County Technology Center (Pearisburg)
The schools have a combined enrollment of 2425 as of mid 2014.

See also
 Giles County Sheriff's Office
 National Register of Historic Places in Giles County, Virginia

References

External links
 http://gilescounty.org/
 Giles County Web Portal

 
Virginia counties
1806 establishments in Virginia
Populated places established in 1806
Blacksburg–Christiansburg metropolitan area
Counties of Appalachia